Eurosport 2 Xtra is a German pay-television sports channel which broadcasts several Bundesliga matches and the DFL-Supercup in the seasons 2017/18-2020/21 exclusively which Warner Bros. Discovery won in the tender of national media rights arranged by the Deutsche Fußball Liga (DFL).

Broadcasting rights

Football
Bundesliga (thirty games on Friday afternoon at 20:30, five games on Sunday afternoon at 13:30, five games on Monday evening at 20:30 and 4 relegation matches at the end of the season)
DFL-Supercup

Distribution
Eurosport 2 Xtra is available in HD quality via the Eurosport Player and in the pay-tv offer of HD+ via Astra 19.2°E. The channel is not available in DVB-C, DVB-T or IPTV networks.

References

External links
 

Television stations in Germany
Television channels and stations established in 2017
2017 establishments in Germany
German-language television stations
Mass media in Munich
Eurosport